Mansfield Lovell (October 20, 1822 – June 1, 1884) was a major general in the Confederate States Army during the American Civil War. As military commander of New Orleans when the city unexpectedly fell to the Union Navy in 1862, Lovell was fiercely criticized by local citizens for failing to predict a naval invasion. The Confederate government also heaped blame on him, to deflect attention from their own error in leaving so few troops to defend the city. A Court of Enquiry later cleared him of charges of incompetence, but his reputation never recovered.

Early life
Lovell was born in the District of Columbia. His father was Joseph Lovell, the eighth Surgeon General of the United States Army. His great grandfather, James Lovell, was an active member of the Whig organization in Boston before the American Revolution, and was a member of the Continental Congress from 1777 to 1782. He was one of the prime movers in the scheme to supplant General George Washington as commander-in-chief by General Horatio Gates and an original member of the Massachusetts Society of the Cincinnati.

Lovell graduated from the United States Military Academy in 1842 and was commissioned as a second lieutenant in the U.S. artillery. He was severely wounded at Belén Gate during the Battle of Chapultepec in the Mexican–American War, receiving a brevet appointment to captain for his service in that battle. After serving on a variety of minor posts, he resigned from the army in 1854 to join the abortive Cuban expedition of General John A. Quitman. He then moved to New York City, where he engaged in business and served as deputy street commissioner.

Civil War
With the outbreak of the Civil War, Lovell left New York City and enlisted in the Confederate army. He was appointed as a major general on October 7, 1861, to replace Maj. Gen. David Twiggs in command at New Orleans, who had asked to be relieved because of health issues. According to the historian John D. Winters, the New Orleans citizenry expressed great disappointment over the Lovell appointment, for they had preferred either P.G.T. Beauregard or Braxton Bragg. At the time Bragg was in command of Confederate forces in Pensacola, Florida. Outraged at being passed over for the command, Bragg wrote to Governor of Louisiana Thomas Overton Moore: "The command at New Orleans was rightly mine. I feel myself degraded by the action of the government and shall take care they know my sentiments." Two weeks later Bragg wrote Moore that he considered Lovell "very competent, and but for his insubordinate vanity would be a fine soldier Still we could do as well without him and he can't make me believe he was not bought."

By the time Lovell was posted to New Orleans, Abraham Lincoln had approved plans for a Union Navy attempt to capture New Orleans by entering the Mississippi River at its mouth and sailing northward 80 miles to the city. Neither Lovell, or the city's officials or the Navy Department in Richmond thought this was a credible option and concentrated on plans to repel Union land forces from approaching the city from the Upper Mississippi area. Forts Jackson and St. Philip, the two Confederate forts  at the mouth of the river, were believed sufficient to discourage an up-river assault in the unlikely event such a tactic was planned. From the beginning of the war, believing the city safe, much of its fighting forces were sent to other Southern battlefields, depleting the city of all but a small number of its Confederate Army defenders. When fishermen brought news of the landing of the Union ships off the Louisiana coast in February 1862, the inability of the Confederates to hold the city if the forts failed became obvious. When the forts could not be captured after several days' bombardment, Farragut's fleet slipped past them under cover of darkness and within four days appeared at the city's docks. While these ships were en route, the decision was made to evacuate the land defenses from New Orleans for use in fighting in the Louisiana interior and other parts of the Confederacy. It is believed Lovell's preparations to protect the city from a land invasion were sound, but Farragut's threat to bombard the vulnerable city with his formidable gunships once the fleet landed brought an end to Confederate New Orleans.

General Lovell was roundly criticized for his failure to prevent the fall of the city even though he did not have sufficient men or materiel to repulse the Union forces. He then commanded an infantry division under Maj. Gen. Earl Van Dorn at the Second Battle of Corinth in Mississippi. Historian Peter Cozzens stated that if Lovell had been more aggressive on the first day of battle, the Confederates might have won the battle. Cozzens excused Lovell's inertia on the second day, writing that any attack was probably doomed to fail. Lovell was later relieved of command as a consequence of his poor performance at New Orleans. Stung by this reprimand, he demanded a court of inquiry, which met in April 1863 and declared him innocent of charges of incompetence. However, he was not given any assignments for the rest of the war.

In his book about Confederate New Orleans, The Night the War Was Lost, author/historian Charles L. Dufour blames Jefferson Davis and in particular Naval Secretary Mallory for deciding that the land war in Virginia took greater precedence over giving more attention to the valuable port city of New Orleans. Its unanticipated fall into Union hands sent shockwaves not only through the Confederacy but Europe as well, where, next to New York City, it was the best-known of American cities. According to Dufour, the Davis government deflected blame onto Lovell for the loss of New Orleans in an effort to avoid being blamed by the Southern public. Lovell's valiant efforts to clear his name never really accomplished their goal. His honor and career were seen by Dufour as having been sadly sacrificed to the political power and reality of war.

Postbellum life
Lovell farmed a rice plantation near Savannah, Georgia, immediately after the war, but a tidal wave destroyed his first crop, forcing him to return with his family to New York City. He resumed his career as a civil engineer and surveyor. Lovell worked under the supervision of former Union general John Newton on a project to clear obstructions from the East River at Hell Gate. He died in New York City and was buried in Woodlawn Cemetery in The Bronx, New York City.

See also

 List of American Civil War generals (Confederate)

Notes

References
 Bergeron, Arthur W., Jr., "Mansfield Lovell", The Confederate General, Vol. 4, Davis, William C., and Julie Hoffman (eds.), National Historical Society, 1991, .
 
 Eicher, John H., and David J. Eicher, Civil War High Commands. Stanford: Stanford University Press, 2001. .
 Sifakis, Stewart. Who Was Who in the Civil War. New York: Facts On File, 1988. .
 Warner, Ezra J. Generals in Gray: Lives of the Confederate Commanders. Baton Rouge: Louisiana State University Press, 1959. .
  Winters, John D. The Civil War in Louisiana. Baton Rouge: Louisiana State University Press, 1963. .

External links
 

1822 births
1884 deaths
People from Washington, D.C.
Confederate States Army major generals
United States Army officers
People of Washington, D.C., in the American Civil War
People of New York (state) in the American Civil War
American military personnel of the Mexican–American War
Members of the Aztec Club of 1847
United States Military Academy alumni
Burials at Woodlawn Cemetery (Bronx, New York)